Lucie Koudelová (born 6 July 1994) is a Czech athlete specialising in the sprint hurdles. She represented her country at two outdoor and one indoor European Championships.

She has personal bests of 13.12 seconds in the 100 metres hurdles (+1.9 m/s, Tábor 2016) and 8.20 seconds in the 60 metres hurdles (Prague 2015).

International competitions

References

1994 births
Living people
Czech female hurdlers
People from Uherské Hradiště
Czech Athletics Championships winners
Competitors at the 2019 Summer Universiade
Sportspeople from the Zlín Region